MANTIS Air Defence System (Modular, Automatic and Network Capable Targeting and Interception System), formerly titled NBS-C-RAM ( Counter Rocket, Artillery, and Mortar), is a very short range air defense protection system of the German Air Force, intended for base-protection. It is produced by Rheinmetall Air Defence, a subsidiary of Rheinmetall of Germany. It is a part of the air force's future SysFla air-defence project.

System
The NBS C-RAM system is intended to detect, track and shoot down incoming projectiles before they can reach their target within very close range. The system itself is based on Oerlikon Contraves' Skyshield air defence gun system. An NBS C-RAM system consists of six 35 mm automatic guns (capable of firing 1,000 rounds per minute), a ground control unit and two sensor units. The guns fire programmable AHEAD ammunition, developed by Rheinmetall Weapons and Munitions - Switzerland (formerly Oerlikon Contraves Pyrotec). The ammunition carries a payload of 152 tungsten projectiles weighing 3.3 g (51 gr) each.

The MANTIS radar can acquire a target within two seconds, then engage it with one of the guns firing a 36-round burst. Two guns directed by one radar each can engage multiple targets. After being manually activated, the system operates fully automatically.

Originally, the German Army ordered a first batch of two systems in 2009, to be delivered in 2013, with two more systems planned to follow later, but were never bought. Both MANTIS systems have been transferred to the German Air Force, which is now responsible for all air defence tasks. The first two systems cost around €110.8 million, plus another €20 million for training and documentation purposes. In a follow-on contract, worth around €13.4 million, Rheinmetall will also deliver the corresponding ammunition to the Bundeswehr.

The German Air Force took possession of the first MANTIS system on January 1, 2011. It was first deployed to Mali at the end of 2017, although without the guns.

On 7 February 2023, Germany announced it would be donating two MANTIS systems to Slovakia to permanently strengthen Slovak air defences.

See also
 CIWS
 LFK NG—the new air-defence missile of the German Army within the "SysFla" project
 Phalanx CIWS—In 2004 the United States began to develop a land-based standalone model of its Phalanx Weapon System called the Centurion CRAM which was deployed to the Middle East in 2008
 Rheinmetall Oerlikon Millennium Gun—Naval CIWS by Rheinmetall using same gun

References

35 mm artillery
Anti-aircraft guns of Germany
Anti-aircraft guns
Anti-aircraft weapons
Military equipment introduced in the 2010s
Missile defense
Post–Cold War weapons of Germany
Rheinmetall